Meenambakkam Metro Station is a metro railway station on the Blue Line of the Chennai Metro. The station serves the neighbourhoods of Meenambakkam and Tirusulam.

Construction
The construction work of the station was awarded to URC Construction Company Private Limited, Erode.

Station
The station is an elevated one although the stretch after the station dips below the ground for a brief distance to negotiate the air funnel area of the second runway of the airport.

Traffic
As of 2019, Meenambakkam Metro had a footfall of nearly 2,500 a day.

Parking
The station has a parking lot with a capacity of 200 to 250 vehicles. In December 2019, the CMRL introduced multi-level two-wheeler parking at the station.

Station layout

See also

 List of Chennai metro stations
 Chennai Metro
 Chennai International Airport
 Meenambakkam

References

External links
Official Website for Chennai Metro Rail Limited

Chennai Metro stations
Railway stations in Chennai